Boeing Phantom Works is the advanced prototyping arm of the defense and security side of Boeing. Its primary focus is developing advanced military products and technologies, many of them highly classified.

Founded by McDonnell Douglas, the research and development group continued after Boeing acquired the company. Its logo is similar to one used for the McDonnell Douglas F-4 Phantom fighter.

Scope and responsibility
Phantom Works' organization mirrors that of Boeing's Defense business units, with 'Advanced' versions of each unit (e.g. Advanced Boeing Military Aircraft). The underlying technology is provided by the Boeing Research and Technology (BR&T) organization, who develop new technologies (i.e. Technology Readiness Level 1–4) for use by Boeing's Commercial and Defense units.  Phantom Works responsibility is to grow those technologies into prototype (i.e. Technology Readiness Level 4–6) to then transition those prototypes to the business units to turn into products (i.e. Technology Readiness Level 7–9).

Locations
Headquartered in Washington D.C., Phantom Works has projects in most Boeing locations in the United States.

Additionally an international group does modelling and simulation work for various governments in the United States, Britain, Australia, and India.

Known projects

 Boeing Airpower Teaming System: Fighter-sized UAV intended to accompany crewed military aircraft 
 Boeing Phantom Eye: High Altitude Long Endurance reconnaissance drone
 XS-1: Reusable suborbital space plane
 Boeing Phantom Ray: Unmanned flying test bed for advanced air system technologies
 Boeing X-51 Waverider:  Hypersonic vehicle
 Boeing Condor: High Altitude Long Endurance concept drone
 McDonnell Douglas YF-23: Black Widow Advanced Fighter concept
 McDonnell Douglas A-12 Avenger II:  Advanced Navy Stealth Fighter concept
  Boeing X-32 Joint Strike Fighter
 Boeing Bird of Prey: Stealth fighter UAV demonstrator
 Boeing A160 Hummingbird: UAV helicopter
 Boeing X-40
  Boeing X-45 UCAV
  Boeing X-37 Advanced Technology Demonstrator
 Boeing Pelican ULTRA
 Boeing X-48 Blended Wing Body demonstrator
 X-53 Active Aeroelastic Wing
 Quad TiltRotor (with Bell Helicopter)
 F/A-XX: sixth generation fighter concept
 Echo Voyager, an autonomous underwater vehicle

See also
 Skunk Works, a similar division of Lockheed Martin
 NASA Eagleworks

References

External links
 Boeing Phantom Works

Boeing
Research organizations in the United States